MellemFingaMuzik is a Danish hip-hop group, consisting of rappers Stepz (Ibrahim Kucukavci) and Branco (Benjamin Cimatu). The duo started publishing materials in late 2011, after which they joined the Danish record label HideOut that also had signed up rappers Jooks and Sivas. When HideOut closed, MellemFingaMuzik started a collaboration with the newly formed label Grounded. They also teamed up with Benny Jamz and Gilli, from the B.O.C. collective, and all formed the common front and collective known as the Molotov Movement (now known as Molo).

MellemFingaMuzik released a self-titled EP, being a mix of songs previously released on YouTube, as well as two new tracks "Salute" and "Molotov".

Members
In addition, both Stepz and Branco have released solo materials

Branco
Benjamin Branco is a Danish musician and rapper. He released his album Baba Business at the end of June 2019.

In 2020, Branco collaborated with Gilli in the duo Branco & Gilli with a chart topping album Euro Connection and the #1 chart topping single "La danza".

In 2021, Branco collaborated with Lukas Graham with a single No Evil.

He has also pursued a film career with a role as Branco in the 2017 Danish film Underverden (in English meaning Underworld). The film is directed by Fenar Ahmad and the English title was marketed as Darkland.

Stepz
Ibrahim Kucukavci known by the stage name Stepz released his album Stepzologi in September 2019. His single "Endnu" from the album featuring Gilli, Benny Jamz & Branco made it to #3 on the Hitlisten, the Danish Singles Chart. The album also contains collaborations with Benny Jamz, Sivas in two tracks and with Kesi.

In 2017, he also appeared in the Danish film Underverden (English title Darkland).

Discography: MellemFingaMuzik

Albums

EPs

Singles

Featured in

Discography: Branco

Albums

Singles

Featured in

Other songs

Discography: Stepz

Albums

Singles

Featured in

Other songs

References

Danish hip hop groups